Vitali Yureyvich Komisov (born 11 July 1992) is a Russian former football midfielder.

Club career
He made his debut in the Russian Football National League for FC Khimki on 15 April 2013 in a game against FC Ural Sverdlovsk Oblast.

External links
 Career summary by sportbox.ru 
 

1992 births
Footballers from Moscow
Living people
Russian footballers
Russia youth international footballers
Association football midfielders
FC Dynamo Moscow reserves players
FC Khimki players
FC Fakel Voronezh players
FC Dynamo Saint Petersburg players
FC Neftekhimik Nizhnekamsk players